The International Encyclopedia of Human Geography is a 2009 academic reference work covering human geography. The editors-in-chief are Rob Kitchin and Nigel Thrift and it contains a foreword by Mary Robinson.

Controversy 
The development of the encyclopedia has been subject to episodic controversy resulting from the involvement of a subsidiary of Elsevier's parent company Reed Elsevier – called Spearhead Exhibitions – in the defence exhibition industry. Following a high-profile campaign coordinated on the crit-geog-forum mailing list and focused specifically on a perceived conflict of interest between the arms trade and academic publishing, on June 1, 2007 Reed Elsevier announced that it would be exiting the business during the second half of that year.

References

Elsevier books
Books about cultural geography
2009 non-fiction books
Specialized encyclopedias